The Jevanshir uezd was a county (uezd) of the Elizavetpol Governorate of the Russian Empire, with its center in Terter (present-day Tartar).

Geography
The Jevanshir uezd was made up of two parts, the northeastern lowland and the southwestern mountainous part of Jraberd. The area covered 4,818.4 square verst. The lower part, Arran, was hot and dry during summers which made the inhabitants move to mountainous areas for the duration of season. The winters were mild and short. The middle part of the county is located on the hills and is enriched with forests. The southern part is located high in the mountains. The highest peaks in mountainous ranges stretching from Gokcha are Murovdag (11,219 ft), Gozeldere-bashi (11,606 ft) and Ginal-dag (11,057 ft). A big part of Jevanshir uezd is within the Tartarchay basin, which starts high in the mountains near the border with the Nor Bayazet and Zangezur uezds and flows through the county discharging into Kura. The importance of the river possessed certain importance due to its wide usage in irrigations through the Jevanshir, Elizavetpol, and Shusha uezds.

The administrative center of the uezd was the town Terter, located on the Yelisavetpol (Ganja)-Shusha road, about 681.6 versts from the provincial capital.

History
The territory of Jevanshir and Jebrail uezds was a part of Karabakh Khanate. In 1869, it was created out of a northern part of Shusha uezd.

After the dissolution of the Russian Empire and the formation of the independent Transcaucasian republics, including the Azerbaijan Democratic Republic in 1918, the western mountainous districts of the Elizavetpol Governorate including the Shusha, Zangezur, Jebrail, Jevanshir, Kazakh and Elizavetpol uezds became subject to intense territorial disputes between Armenia and Azerbaijan throughout 1918–1920, both of whom included these areas in their territorial pretensions that they presented in memorandums to the Paris Peace Conference.

Since the collapse of Russian authority in the Transcaucasus, the mountainous portion of the uezd, which was overwhelmingly Armenian, was governed by the de facto Karabakh Council which vehemently rejected Ottoman and Azerbaijani attempts to subordinate the region. However, following the arrival of British forces in Transcaucasia, the Karabakh Council reluctantly submitted to provisional Azerbaijani rule through the Governor-Generalship of Karabakh, led by Dr. Khosrov bey Sultanov, due to the exerted British pressure on the council in August 1919.

Following the establishment of Soviet rule in Azerbaijan, the county was partitioned into several rayons, with the overwhelmingly Armenian subsections forming part of the Nagorno-Karabakh Autonomous Oblast.

Administrative divisions 
The subcounties (uchastoks) of the Jevanshir uezd in 1912 were as follows:

Economy 
The county had 213 settlements and its population was engaged primarily in agriculture and cattlebreeding with the population in lowland part of uezd engaged in sericulture and gardening. The mountainous parts above wooden mountains were used as mountain pastures, the lower regions of the highland were cultivated for growing barley and wheat. The lowland area was used for growing cotton, rice and other various plants. The agricultural data from 1891 states the cattle stock numbered 52,800 while small cattle numbered 112,000. There were 34 factories with a total production output accounting to 37,914 rubles.

Demographics

Russian Empire Census 
The plurality of the population indicated Tatar to be their mother tongue, with a significant Armenian speaking minority.

Kavkazskiy kalendar 
The statistics indicated Shia Muslims were the majority of the population of the district with significant Armenian and Sunni Muslim minorities:

Notes

References

Bibliography 

Geographic history of Azerbaijan
States and territories established in 1869
States and territories disestablished in 1918
Uezds of Elizavetpol Governorate
1869 establishments in the Russian Empire